Triplophysa wuweiensis is a species of stone loach endemic to Wuwei, Gansu, China.  Type specimen was found in Wuwei, Gansu, China. It grows to  standard length.

References

wuweiensis
Freshwater fish of China
Endemic fauna of Gansu
Fish described in 1974
Taxa named by Li Sizhong (ichthyologist)